Aleksandr Alekseyevich Loparyov (born 9 February 2002) is a Russian football player. He plays for FC Orenburg-2.

Club career
He made his debut in the Russian Football National League for FC Orenburg on 17 October 2020 in a game against FC Spartak-2 Moscow.

References

External links
 
 Profile by Russian Football National League

2002 births
Living people
Russian footballers
Association football midfielders
FC Orenburg players
Russian First League players
Russian Second League players